The Gibson Desert Nature Reserve is an 18,900 km2 nature reserve located in the Gibson Desert in central Western Australia. The nature reserve is remote and rarely visited by tourists, and is administered by the Kalgoorlie regional office of the Department of Environment and Conservation. Located in Australia's arid zone, the reserve's landscape features include sand dune and plains, stony mesaform hills and undulating laterite plains. The dominant vegetation is spinifex interspersed with low shrubs and trees.  In 2020, an agreement with the Gibson Desert People and the Western Australian Government, gave the name Pila Reserve to the area, with management to be shared by the traditional owners, the Gibson Desert People and the Department of Biodiversity Conservation and Attractions.

Further reading

References

Nature reserves in Western Australia